Tapolca is a town in Veszprém County, Hungary, close to Lake Balaton.
The town has an outer suburb, Tapolca-Diszel, approximately 5 km to the East.

Etymology 
The origin of Tapolca is disputed, originating either from the Hungarian Tapolcza,  meaning "high place", or from the Slavic Toplica/Teplica meaning "hot springs". It was also known as Turul or Turultapolca at some points in the Middle Ages.

Notable sights

The Lake Cave 

This 3 km long lake cave system is situated in the heart of the town. It was opened to the public in 1912, ten years after its discovery. Small boats can be hired to explore the cave system.
At 15–20 m below the town, a 5 km long cave system criss-crosses the Miocene limestone layers. This includes the 3.3 km long Lake Cave, which is mostly filled with karst water. The cave was discovered in 1903 during well digging. Thanks to these explorations, round boat trips were made possible from 1937. Because of its special origin and unique formations, it was designated a protected area in 1942 and placed under strict protection in 1982.
The mixture of the cold karst water flowing there and the thermal water up-surging from the deep dissolves limestone. Initially narrow passages, then smaller and larger niches were formed. Over a very long period, these widened into spacious chambers and passages. Dripstones have not developed in the cave, as several metre thick clay deposits prevents infiltration from the surface. Only calcareous formations (cave corals and aragonite crystals) occur at some places, having precipitated from the cave air. Bats cannot enter the closed spaces, so the largest vertebrate is a 10 cm long fish, the Common minnow (Phoxinus phoxinus L.), which probably swims in through the wet passages from the Malom-tó (Mill Pond). The cave air, with nearly 100% humidity, a high calcium content and a constant temperature of 20 °C, is used to cure respiratory diseases in the branches under the town hospital that are in close proximity with the cave. The radon content of the cave air is too low to have any effect on the visitors.

Mill Pond 

A romantic part of the town is the Mill Pond (Malom-tó). The Upper Pond can be reached from the Main Square through a small backyard where the "Four Seasons", a sculpture by László Marton, is situated.

Garden of Ruins 

The Church Hill is the medieval centre of Tapolca. The church was built in the 13th century in Roman style, during the 14th century it was finished as Gothic church. After the Ottoman invasion, it was rebuilt in Baroque style in 1756.

School Museum 

The School Museum is located in the former cantor house. The greatest pedagogic collection of the Transdanubian region can be found there.

Main Square 

The former marketplace of the town, the Main Square, functioned as a trade centre from ancient times. The statue of Holy Trinity was erected in the middle of the square in 1757. Another masterpiece, the Little Princess, is located there too.

Notable inhabitants 

 János Batsányi (1763–1845), poet, philosopher
 József Cserhát, poet, writer, editor
 László Marton (1925–2008), sculptor
 József Csermák (1932–2001) athlete, (hammer-throwing gold medal 1952. Helsinki)
 István Péter Németh (born 1960), poet, literary historian
 Pál Sümegi (born 1960), associate professor
 Gábor Boczkó (born 1977), fencer
 Vera Tóth (born 1985), singer, the winner of the Hungarian Megasztár 2004
 Gabi Tóth (born 1988), singer, younger sister of Vera Tóth

Twin towns – sister cities

Tapolca is twinned with:

 Este, Italy
 Lempäälä, Finland
 Ružinov (Bratislava), Slovakia
 Stadthagen, Germany
 Sümeg, Hungary
 Zăbala, Romania

Gallery

References

External links
 Tapolcai kirándulás képekkel – www.élet-mód.hu
 Balaton Uplands National Park Tapolca – Cave Lake

Populated places in Veszprém County